Bila River may refer to: 
Bila River (Bosnia and Herzegovina), a river in Bosnia and Herzegovina
Bila River (Indonesia), a river in Indonesia
Bila River (Romania), a river in Romania